Vitalisia alternata is a species of beetle in the family Cerambycidae. It was described by Fairmaire in 1895. It is known from Laos and Vietnam.

See Also
Vitalisia, a genus of grasshoppers

References

Apomecynini
Beetles described in 1895